Aeronaves TSM is an airline company based in Saltillo, Mexico. The company was founded in 1995, and operates both chartered flights and cargo flights. Their aircraft are used for cargo operations and are operated for DHL Aviation. Aeronaves TSM also provides flight training and ground school. Aeronaves TSM averages about 10,000 charter operations every year and 30 flights per day. The average fleet age of the airline is about 36 years.

Fleet
As of March 2023, the Aeronaves TSM fleet consists of the following aircraft:

Accidents and incidents 
On January 18, 2014, Aeronaves TSM McDonnell Douglas DC-9-33RC with registration XA-UQM was significantly damaged at Saltillo Airport. It touched down on the last third of the runway and the nose gear collapsed. The probable cause was the crew not seeing the runway properly due to dense fog, so they touched down hard and braked too much resulting in landing gear collapsing.

On June 2, 2015, an Aeronaves TSM Swearingen SA226-TC Metro II with the registration of XA-UKP was on a post-maintenance test flight from Querétaro Intercontinental Airport (QRO). After reaching 9,000 feet of altitude, the crew most likely lost control of the aircraft and crashed in Highway 57. The probable cause of the loss of control is still undetermined.

On June 2, 2017, an Aeronaves TSM Swearingen SA227-AC Metro III with registration XA-UAJ, crash landed at Tampico International Airport, Mexico, due to aircraft fuel exhaustion. The aircraft departed Saltillo Airport at 21:27 on a non-scheduled cargo flight to Puebla, Mexico, carrying approximately 550 kg of cargo. Before departure, the plane needed about 2000 lb of fuel. However, the flight took off without having been properly refueled with just 700 lb of fuel. At 22:27 hours the flight declared an emergency to the Mexico City ACC controller. The crew decided to divert to Tampico. They crash landed 850 meters from the start of the runway with both crew injured.

On September 15, 2022, an Aeronaves TSM Fairchild Swearingen Metroliner XA-UMW took off from Runway 15 at Saltillo, climbed to approximately 800 feet AGL and experienced engine failure and extreme vibrations from the right hand engine. The aircraft subsequently made a forced landing 2.4 nmi north of the airport. The flight crew were taken to hospital for a checkup but were promptly discharged. The aircraft suffered substantial damage.

References

External links
 Aeronaves TSM Fleet Details and History planespotters.net
 Aeronaves TSM ( /VTM) flightera.net
 aviation-safety.net Aeronaves TSM 
 aviation-safety.net 2 Juni 2015, Highway 57
 aviation-safety.net 18 January 2014, Saltillo Airport
 aviation-safety.net 2 Juni 207,Tampico International Airport

Airlines of Mexico
Airlines established in 1995
1995 establishments in Mexico
Transportation in Coahuila
Cargo airlines of Mexico